This is an alphabetical list of museums in Bangladesh.

List of Museum 
 Ahsan Manzil
 Bagha Museum
 Bangladesh Air Force Museum
 Bangladesh Maritime Museum
 Bangladesh Bank Taka Museum
 Bangladesh Military Museum
 Bangladesh National Museum 
 Birshreshtha Munshi Abdur Rouf Library and Museum 
 Bogra District Council Museum
 Bangabandhu Memorial Museum
 Birisiri Upajatya Cultural Academy Museum (Near Mymensingh) 
 Chandpur Fisheries Museum
 Comilla Rammala Museum 
 Cox's Bazar Fisheries Museum
 Children's Museum (Shishu Academy)
 Dhaka Nagar Jadughar 
 Dinajpur Museum 
 Ethnological Museum of Chittagong
 Fish Museum & Biodiversity Centre
 Folk Heritage Museum (Bangla Academy) 
 Faridpur Museum
 Jamalpur Estate Museum, Thakurgoan 
 Kushtia Museum
 Khulna Divisional Museum 
 Kishoreganj Museum
 Lalbagh Fort 
 Liberation War Museum
 Lokayon Museum
 Archaeological Museum of Mahasthangarh
 Mainamati
 Michel Modhusudhan Dutt Museum 
 Museum of Rajas'
 Museum of Independence, Dhaka 
 National Museum of Science and Technology 
 Museum of Geological Survey of Bangladesh 
 Mymensingh Museum
 National Art Gallery (Bangladesh)
 National Museum of Science and Technology
 Natore Rajbari
 Osmani Museum
 Panchagarh Rocks Museum
 Philatelic Museum 
 Bangladesh Police Liberation War Museum
 Postal Museum
 Rangpur Museum 
 Sunamganj Hasan Raja Museum 
 Sonargaon Bangladesh Folk Art Museum (Near Dhaka) 
 Shilaidaha Kuthibari Memorial Museum (Near Kushtia) 
 Shahjadpur Kacharibari Memorial Museum (Near Pabna) 
 Tajhat Palace
 Tribal Museum  
 Varendra Research Museum
 Zainul Abedin Museum
 Zia Memorial Museum
 Sreemangal Tea Resort and Museum
 Bengal Center
 K.B. Ahsanullah (R:) Museum
 Paharpur Archaeological Museum

See also 

 List of museums
 List of libraries in Bangladesh

External links 

Museums
 
Museums
Bangladesh
Museums
Bangladesh